1993–94 Croatian First A League was the third season of First A League. It was the third season of Croatian handball to be played after their departure from the Yugoslav First League.

First phase

League 12

Second phase

Championship play-offs 

Bold result - home match for Club1 
Normally written score - away match for Club1

Placement play-offs

Relegation play-offs

Final standings

Sources
 Fredi Kramer, Dražen Pinević: Hrvatski rukomet = Croatian handball, Zagreb, 2009.; page 178
 Petar Orgulić: 50 godina rukometa u Rijeci, Rijeka, 2004.; pages 230 and 231
 Kruno Sabolić: Hrvatski športski almanah 1992/1993, Zagreb, 1992.

References

External links
Croatian Handball Federation
Croatian Handball Portal

1993-94
handball
handball
1993–94 domestic handball leagues